Panorama Hills may refer to:

 Panorama Hills, Calgary, Canada, a suburban residential neighbourhood
 Panorama Hills, Illinois, US, an unincorporated community
 Panorama Hills (California), US, a mountain range